Ainsworth Rand Spofford (September 12, 1825 – August 11, 1908) was an American journalist, prolific writer and the sixth Librarian of Congress. He served as librarian from 1864 to 1897 under the administration of ten presidents. A great admirer of Benjamin Franklin, he wrote a twenty-one page introduction in Franklin's autobiography, which he edited and published.

Early life
Spofford was born in Gilmanton, New Hampshire.  Ill health prevented him from attending Amherst College.  He instead, at age 19, moved to Cincinnati, Ohio, where he became a bookseller, publisher, and newspaper man at The Cincinnati Commercial Tribune.

In 1849, Spofford founded the Literary Club of Cincinnati with John Celivergos Zachos, Stanley Matthews and nine others. Prominent members included Rutherford B. Hayes and Alphonso Taft; notable club guests Ralph Waldo Emerson, Booker T. Washington, Mark Twain, and Robert Frost.  In 1850 prominent abolitionist and woman's rights activist John Celivergos Zachos named his son Ainsworth to honor Spofford.

In 1851, in response to the Fugitive Slave Law, he published the pamphlet The Higher Law, Tried by Reason and Authority, which argued that "Injustice is the only treason; no law can legalize it, no constitution can sanction it." Readers included Emerson, who shared Spofford's antislavery principles. In 1859 Spofford became associate editor of the Cincinnati Commercial.  He was also active in Republican politics and was a delegate to the 1856 Republican National Convention, where John C. Frémont was nominated.

While in Washington, D.C., in 1861, shortly after reporting on the First Battle of Bull Run for The Cincinnati Commercial, Spofford accepted the position of Chief Assistant Librarian of Congress under the Librarian of Congress John G. Stephenson. Once Spofford learned of the impending retirement of Stephenson, Spofford gathered enough political endorsements for the position, which later led President Abraham Lincoln to promote Spofford to the post of Librarian of Congress in 1864.

He was elected as a member to the American Philosophical Society in 1873.

Librarian of Congress

Spofford served as the Librarian of Congress from 1864 to 1897, a tenure that saw the expansion of the library's collections and notable changes in its methods of collection development. According to the library's published history, Spofford contributed to the Jeffersonian vision for the library that a “democratic form of government depended on a comprehensive base of knowledge and information.”

Spofford is generally credited with overseeing the expansion of the Library from a Congressional resource into a national institution. During his tenure, the library's collection expanded from over 60,000 items to more than one million. Among his more noted acquisitions was the purchase of a vast collection of early American archives from noted archivist Peter Force.  Spofford's hopes were to follow the great library models of Europe, in which "the library would be a comprehensive collection of the literature of the nation." Beginning in the 1830s, the Library of Congress began to receive foreign governmental documents and publications. By the late 1860s, Spofford convinced Congress to allow the library to become the repository for international documents. He stated that "there is almost no work, within the vast range of literature and science, which may not at some time prove useful to the legislature of a great nation." Spofford's championing of the copyright law, passed on July 8, 1870, also expanded the library's collection through the copyright registration deposit mandate. The law "centralized all U.S. copyright registration and deposit activities at the Library." and stipulated that two copies of every "book pamphlet, map, print, photograph, and piece of music registered for copyright be deposited in the Library." In arguing for the deposit requirement, Spofford suggested that the legislature would "provide a repository of American culture." In his argument for the copyright law to Congress, he wrote that "the Public intelligence and welfare are promoted by every extension of the means of acquiring knowledge." The law established the library as the de facto national library of the United States and "essentially resolved [any] debate over which institution would serve as America's national library."

Spofford had persuaded Congress to expand the library's space within the Capitol in 1865. As it was becoming the nation's copyright depository happened at about the same time as two major acquisitions: Congress authorized the transfer of the Smithsonian Institution's collection to the Library of Congress and the purchase of the large private collection of Peter Force. Subsequently, the library quickly outgrew its new space, and Spofford proposed construction of a new building for the Library in 1872. Congress quickly agreed, but the project was bogged down in bickering over details. As the collection outgrew the space for it, books and boxes piled conspicuously on the floor. Members of Congress who used the library could hardly find room to work. Although everyone recognized the need for a new building, it took more than a decade to resolve all the issues. Finally, Congress appropriated funds for the new building in 1886. A dispute with the architect further delayed the start of construction until 1888. The building was finally completed in 1897 and is now known as the Thomas Jefferson Building.

In 1897, Spofford stepped aside in favor of a younger librarian, John Russell Young, and returned to his old post of Chief Assistant Librarian, where he remained until his death. Spofford also held a post as professor and department head of library science at the Columbian University in Washington, D.C. During his retirement, Spofford wrote and published A Book for All Readers, and was described by the New York Times as "written from the fullness of knowledge and experience of a veteran librarian for the guidance of younger members of his chosen profession."

Works by Spofford
  Autobiography. Poor Richard. Letters. (New York, D. Appleton and company, (1899)
 A book for all readers, (New York London, G. P. Putnam's sons, (1900) 
 The coming of the white man, and the founding of the national capital, (Washington, D. C., The Academy, 1900) 
 Celebration of the one hundredth anniversary of the establishment of the seat of government in the District of Columbia. (1901)
 The copyright system of the United States--its origin and its growth. (1892)
  Eminent and representative men of Virginia and the District of Columbia in the nineteenth century. With a concise historical sketch of Virginia. (1893)
  The founding of Washington city, (1881)
  Handbook of the new Library of Congress. (1899)
 A handy book of reference on all subjects and for all readers. (1900)
  Library of choice literature and encyclopaedia of universal authorship; selected from the standard authors of all nations and all time. (1895)
  The life and labors of Peter Force, mayor of Washington. (1898)
  Massachusetts in the American Revolution, (1895)
 Memorial of Dr. Joseph M. Toner. (1898)
 The New cabinet cyclopædia and treasury of knowledge. A handy book of reference on all subjects and for all readers. With about two thousand pictorial illustrations, a complete atlas of sixty-four colored maps, and one hundred maps in the text. (1892)
 Virginia Three Hundred Years Ago (1908)

Posthumous reception

While doing research on Spofford, John Y. Cole discovered that while Ainsworth's ashes were interred at Rock Creek Cemetery in Washington, D.C., his tombstone was blank, although his wife's name was there. Spofford was also not listed in the cemetery's handout that noted the famous people buried there. Although Cole was responsible for bringing this to the attention of some Spofford descendants, nothing was done to correct this until 2004, when John Spofford Morgan, Ainsworth Spofford's great-grandson (1917–2015), saw to it that the situation was remedied. Today, the tombstone reads, "Ainsworth Rand Spofford, 1825–1908, Librarian of Congress, 1864–1897, Appointed by President Lincoln."  His name is also now listed in the cemetery's handout on notable figures whose tombstones can be viewed there.

References

Sources

External links

 
 
 
 

1825 births
1908 deaths
American male journalists
19th-century American journalists
American publishers (people)
Librarians of Congress
People from Gilmanton, New Hampshire
Burials at Rock Creek Cemetery
19th-century publishers (people)
Journalists from New Hampshire
American abolitionists
Ohio Republicans
19th-century American businesspeople